The 2019 Sochi FIA Formula 2 round was a pair of motor races held on 28 and 29 September 2019 at the Sochi Autodrom in Sochi, Russia as part of the FIA Formula 2 Championship. It was the tenth and penultimate round of the 2019 FIA Formula 2 Championship and was run in support of the 2019 Russian Grand Prix.

ART Grand Prix driver Nyck de Vries won the feature race; in doing so, he mathematically clinched the drivers' championship with three races remaining. De Vries is also the first non-rookie driver to win the championship in the modern Formula 2 era.

Classification

Qualifying

Feature Race

Sprint Race 
The race was supposed to last for 21 laps but because of the collision between Nikita Mazepin and Nobuharu Matsushita that lead to a red flag, the race was shorted to just 15 laps.

Championship standings after the round

Drivers' Championship standings

Teams' Championship standings

References

External links
 

Sochi
Sochi
September 2019 sports events in Russia